Statistics of Division 2 in the 1937–38 season.

Overview
It was contested by 25 teams, and Le Havre won the championship.

Group stage

Nord

Ouest

Est

Sud

Playoff

Promotion group

Relegation group

References
France - List of final tables (RSSSF)

Ligue 2 seasons
France
2